This is a guide to the size of the wards in Stratford district based on the data from the 2001 UK Census. The entire population of the district was 111,484.

N.B. Ward populations will differ from the village population which they are named after and which they are linked to as ward boundaries very rarely match village boundaries exactly.

References

List of wards in Stratford district by population
Stratford district, wards
Stratford